Fatih Karaca (born 31 August 1985), better known by his stage name Mabel Matiz, is a Turkish pop music singer-songwriter.

He chose his stage name from two different words that he was inspired by. "Mabel" is from the Turkish novel Kumral Ada Mavi Tuna by Buket Uzuner. It is the nickname of Tuna, who is one of the main characters. "Matiz" is a slang word in the old Greek language meaning "drunk". "Mabel Matiz" reflects his point of view about the world and life.

He has released four studio albums.

Musical career 
He began releasing his own songs via Myspace in 2008. Turkish music producer Engin Akıncı noticed his songs and offered him an album. He released his first studio album, Mabel Matiz, in 2011 with Esen Müzik label. Except two songs, which were written by Birhan Keskin and Yalçın Tosun, all of the other pieces were written and composed by Mabel Matiz himself.

He released his second studio album, Yaşım Çocuk, in 2013 with DMC label. He covered popular Yıldız Tilbe song "Aşk Yok Olmaktır" in this album. Various songs from the album, including "Zor Değil", "Aşk Yok Olmaktır", "Yaşım Çocuk" and "Alaimisema" became popular hits and Milliyet Sanat awarded it as the "Album of the Year". He contributed in Aysel Gürel tribute album, Aysel'in, in June 2013 by performing Sezen Aksu cover "Sultan Süleyman".

Personal life 
He grew up a son of a truck driver and Cyprus veteran father Ali, and housewife mother Maya. As a child, he suffered from a severe stutter that made it hard for him to express himself. However, he managed to overcome that by boosting his self-esteem through writing and music. By high school, he was even playing in a theater company. After completing his compulsory education in Mersin, he moved to Istanbul for university education and graduated from Istanbul University, Dentistry Faculty in 2008. He briefly worked in a healthcare clinic until advancing into music career. He is an LGBTI+ rights activist.

In memory of his parents, Mabel gave his mother's name to his 4th studio album Maya, while the song "Babamı Beklerken" ([while] waiting for my father) on the album is written for his father, who later died on 23 February 2019 at age 66.

In the Turkish literature section of the Higher Education Institutions Exam held on 27 June 2020, a total of 2 questions containing lyrics from Mabel Matiz's album Maya and the song "Fırtınadayım" were asked, which later caused a stir on social media.

Discography

Studio albums

Compilation albums

Singles

Other contributions

References

External links

 Official site
 
 

Living people
1985 births
Turkish lyricists
Turkish pop singers
Turkish rock singers
Turkish-language singers
Turkish dentists
21st-century Turkish singers
21st-century Turkish male singers
Golden Butterfly Award winners